Histone-lysine N-methyltransferase KMT5B is an enzyme that in humans is encoded by the KMT5B gene. The enzyme along with WHSC1 is responsible for dimethylation of lysine 20 on histone H4 in mouse and humans.

This gene encodes a protein that contains a SET domain. SET domains appear to be protein-protein interaction domains that mediate interactions with a family of proteins that display similarity with dual-specificity phosphatases (dsPTPases). Two alternatively spliced transcript variants have been found for this gene.

References

Further reading